The Last Adventure is a 1974 Swedish drama film directed by Jan Halldoff. The film won the award for Best Film and Göran Stangertz won the award for Best Actor at the 11th Guldbagge Awards.

Cast
 Göran Stangertz as Jimmy Mattsson
 Ann Zacharias as Helfrid
 Marianne Aminoff as Jimmy's Mother
 Tomas Bolme as Dr. Davidson
 Åke Lindström as Principal
 Birger Malmsten as Company Commander
 Margit Carlqvist as Sally
 Gösta Krantz as Captain

References

External links
 
 

1974 films
1974 drama films
Swedish drama films
1970s Swedish-language films
Best Film Guldbagge Award winners
Films directed by Jan Halldoff
1970s Swedish films